Apiocephalus is a genus of beetles in the family Cerambycidae, containing the following species:

 Apiocephalus licheneus Gahan, 1906
 Apiocephalus punctipennis Gahan, 1898

References

Lepturinae